Live In Paris – Olympia 1971 is a live album by Ike & Tina Turner released by United Artists Records and Liberty Records in Europe.

Recording and release 
By 1971, Ike & Tina Turner had incorporated rock songs into their repertoire and mainly performed covers of recent hits. They performed songs by the Beatles and the Rolling Stones, while still remaining true to their R&B and soul roots with covers like "Respect" by Otis Redding and "I Want To Take You Higher" by Sly and the Family Stone. In January 1971, Liberty Records released the single "Proud Mary" from the album Workin' Together to coincide with Ike & Tina Turner's French tour. The tour included dates at the Olympia in Paris. The concert on January 30, 1971 was recorded and released as a double album in Europe later that year. The album was arranged by Ike Turner and produced by Eddie Adamis. It peaked at number 25 in Germany.

Reissues 
Live in Paris was first reissued on CD by FNAC Music in 1992. It has since been reissued on CD by EMI Music in 2000 and Universal Music in 2018.

Track listing

Chart performance

References 

1971 live albums
Ike & Tina Turner live albums
Liberty Records live albums
United Artists Records live albums
Live funk rock albums